Doris flabellifera is a species of sea slug, a dorid nudibranch, a marine gastropod mollusk in the family Dorididae.

Distribution
This species was described from New Zealand.

References

Dorididae
Gastropods described in 1881
Taxa named by Thomas Frederic Cheeseman
Gastropods of New Zealand